Liyang is a county-level city under the administration of Changzhou in the Jiangsu province of the People's Republic of China. In 2011, it had a population of about 781,500. It borders the prefecture-level divisions of Wuxi to the east, Xuancheng (Anhui) to the south, and Nanjing to the west.

Administration
In August 1990, the PRC State Council approved the upgrade of Liyang from a county to a county-level city under the administration of the prefecture-level city of Changzhou.

In the present, Liyang City has 10 towns.
10 towns

Geography
Liyang resides at the boundary of Jiangsu and Anhui provinces and is part of the Yangtze River Delta.

Climate

Transportation
The Nanjing–Hangzhou Passenger Railway crosses Liyang. As of 2020, over 80 passenger trains make daily stops at Liyang Railway Station, which is located 5 kilometres south of downtown Liyang. The shortest commute time to major cities nearby by train is 26 minutes for Nanjing and 53 minutes for Hangzhou. There are also direct connections to other major Chinese cities such as Beijing, Shanghai, Xiamen, Tianjin, Qingdao, Wuhan, Changsha, and Kunming.

National highways G25 and G4011 cross Liyang.  

The nearest major airport is Nanjing Lukou International Airport, roughly one hour by car away.

Language
The dialect spoken by most people in Liyang is a Northern Wu dialect closely related to that of Changzhou, while others speak Standard Mandarin or Jianghuai Mandarin.

Sights
Tian Mu Lake inside Liyang, is a popular tourist area featuring the lake, resorts, and famous fish head soup. 
Nanshan Zhuhai is another tourist site with great views of bamboo trees all over the hills.
It is also an artificial lake.

Education
Nanjing University of Aeronautics and Astronautics has a campus in Liyang for its School of Civil Aviation and School of General Aviation.

Liyang Guanghua Senior High School

Notable people
Wu Yun Dong, theoretical organic chemist

Twin cities 
 Leeuwarden, Netherlands (since 2011)

References

External links 
Liyang City English guide (Jiangsu.NET)

Cities in Jiangsu
Changzhou